General elections were held in Burma on 26 November 1936. The Government of Burma Act 1935 separated Burma from British India as of 1 April 1937, and created a 36-seat Senate and a 132-seat House of Representatives. The pro-constitution United GCBA of U Ba Pe emerged as the largest bloc in the House of Representatives, winning 46 seats. However, few parties were willing to work with U Ba Pe, and the Governor invited Ba Maw to form a government, despite his Poor Man's Party winning only 16 seats. Maw became Chief Minister after forming a coalition with Chit Hlaing and other "moderate extremists".

Electoral system
The 132 seats in House of Representatives consisted of 91 members elected in single-member non-communal constituencies and 41 members elected from reserved seats. However, large areas of the country in the north and east including the Shan States remained directly governed by the Governor and did not elect members of the House. Half of the 36 seats in the Senate were appointed by the Governor, whilst the remaining half were elected by members of the House of Representatives.

Campaign
Several of the reserved seats were uncontested, including Bassein North (Karen), Mandalay Indian Urban, the three-member European constituency, the Burmese Chamber of Commerce seat, the Nakkukottai Chettyar's Association seat, the five-member Burma Chamber of Commerce constituency, the Rangoon Trades Association seat and the Chinese Chamber of Commerce seat.

Results

Aftermath
Despite winning the most seats, the United GCBA was unable to form a government as the party began to split soon after the elections. This allowed the Poor Man's Party to put together a coalition government which took power in March 1937; it included former People's Party member U Pu, U Paw Tun from the Hlaing-Myat-Paw GCBA, Saw Pe Tha from the Karen group and U Htoon Aung Gyaw from the Arakanese. Poor Man's Party MPs U Tharrawaddy Maung Maung and Thein Maung were also appointed to the cabinet, whilst Chit Hlaing became Speaker of the House. The government also gained support from the commercial MPs, many of the Poor Man's Party's more radical campaign promises were dropped.

References

Burma
Elections in Myanmar
1936 in Burma
Election and referendum articles with incomplete results